Metropolis Street Racer (MSR) is a racing video game developed by Bizarre Creations and published by Sega exclusively for Dreamcast. The game was intended to be a Dreamcast launch title, however, due to numerous delays it was not released in Europe until November 2000, with a North American version following in January 2001. A Japanese version was in development and briefly offered for online reservation in January 2001 with an expected release date of 22 February 2001, but ultimately canceled after Sega discontinued support for Dreamcast. The game is the first entry in Bizarre Creations' Project Gotham Racing series.

As well as being an early example of an open world racing game, Metropolis Street Racer is notable for introducing the "Kudos" system (whereby players are rewarded for racing stylishly as well as quickly) into video games, and for its detailed and accurate recreations of the cities of London, Tokyo and San Francisco. Music for the game was composed by Richard Jacques, and delivered via nine fictional radio stations (three for each city), similar to the Grand Theft Auto series. The day/night time spectrum during game play is realistic, in that the game uses the internal clock of the Dreamcast to calculate the present time in each city. Play at 8AM in England, for example, and the San Francisco races will all be at night (12 AM).

A selling point of Metropolis Street Racer was the large number of tracks available (262 in total), created by blocking off certain areas of the city to lead the player around specific roads and paths. However, only a small number are available at the start of play and most are unlocked by playing through the single player mode.

Gameplay
Gameplay in MSR is centred around the single-player mode, with tracks and cars in the multiplayer mode being unlocked at the same time as in the single-player game. The premise is that, as a street racer, the player must impress other drivers with quick but stylish driving in a series of challenges. These challenges are in sets of ten (called Chapters - there are 25 in total), with completion of all challenges opening the next chapter (assuming the player has enough Kudos, see below) and unlocking a new car. Each challenge is on a different track, and unlocking a challenge unlocks that track in the time-attack and multiplayer modes.

Challenges
 Hotlap: Race solo around a track - typically three laps - and attempt to beat a specific time. An alternate version records the average time for all laps.
 One-on-one: A race (again, usually three laps) against an opponent. The player can give themselves or the computer opponent a head start up to 60 seconds.
 Street Race: A single race against multiple opponents.
 Championship: A four-race series against three opponents. Points are received based on the player's position at the end of each race. Usually this is the last challenge in the chapter.
 Challenge: A race with custom rules, such as passing a certain number of cars within a time limit.

Some challenges (usually the Challenge category) have a time unlock, which allows secret cars or cheats to be unlocked by completing the challenge during a certain time. The challenge can still be completed at a different time, but doing so will not unlock the reward.

Kudos
Kudos (from Greek κῦδος, meaning 'praise' or 'glory') is the currency of MSR. It is earned during the challenges in two categories - Skill and Style. Skill Kudos are earned by completing a challenge successfully. The difficulty of challenges is user-configurable - for example, reducing the time limit, or increasing the head start of opponents - with harder challenges rewarding more Kudos for completion. Style Kudos are earned by drifting - using the hand-brake to skid while turning. A "K" symbol appears when drifting, and becomes brighter the longer and more pronounced the drift is. The more opaque the symbol, the more Kudos earned. Kudos are also awarded for finishing a race without colliding with obstacles or other cars. Kudos are lost if the driver collides with a wall, obstacle or other car (theoretically Kudos are not lost if another car collides with the player, but this is not always the case); or by failing the challenge, which results in a final Kudos total of -25 "K" for the whole challenge. Cancelling a challenge will even result in -50 "K".

Kudos are calculated on a per-challenge basis. Each challenge's Kudos result is stored, and only the last attempt at a challenge is stored. If, for example a challenge is completed with 250 "K", then subsequently attempted unsuccessfully, that challenge's result becomes -25 "K".

Through playing the game, "Joker" cards may be earned. Playing one of these cards before starting a challenge will double the amount of Kudos gained or lost during that attempt.

Cars
In the single-player mode, the player has a garage which holds up to six cars. In order to "buy" a car, the player must complete a challenge in that car - usually completing a short lap within a time limit. The player has unlimited time to complete the challenge, and once completed, can customise the car.

The colour of the car and the opacity of the windows can be changed, as can the number plate. ABS may also be switched on or off, and convertible cars may be set as hard-top, soft-top or open-top for different weather conditions.

Kudos is also tied to player cars. As there are initially only three spaces in the garage, occasionally it is necessary to dispose of cars to make space for better cars unlocked during play. However, disposing of a car also penalises the player 10% of the Kudos earned in that car. This is intended to encourage the player to switch cars less often, or to spend time in their preferred car on lower Chapters later gaining higher Kudos results.

Lack of replay option
The replay feature was removed from all retail versions of MSR due to time constraints. This is despite the fact review copies for magazines included this option and the US instruction manual implied they were present. Pre-recorded demo races are available to watch from replay angles but nothing else. In Issue #16 of the UK's Official Dreamcast Magazine (ODM), Martyn Chudley gave the following explanation for the removal:

"Unfortunately, there was a problem with the replays which the Sega testers discovered near the end of development. We tried for about two weeks to fix this bug but time ran out, so the only thing we could do was remove the replays. We're upset that we had to do that, but with no time left, there was no other choice."

Online functionality
While MSR did not allow network racing, various features can be accessed via the Internet option in the main menu:
 Time Trial: A time attack with a specific car, course and weather condition. Best laps can be saved as ghost cars within the trials themselves.  A separate VMU file is created which can be passed onto others to compete against.
 Speed Challenge: These are time attacks on set courses from each city; Market West II (San Francisco), Parliament Street South II (London) and Higashi-Dori Kita II (Tokyo). They can only be raced using the VX220/Opel Speedster cars with automatic gears. Until March 2002, players were able to upload their best times to an online ranking within Dreamarena.

Players registered to Dreamarena/Seganet could also access a special MSR microsite using the built-in browser. It contained the following features:
 Speed Challenge Ranking: the player could enter a best time for each course or an overall best time.
 World Time Trial Ranking: the top 10 best lap records for each course. Players competed by uploading their Time Trial files. These files could then be downloaded by others to challenge.
 World Kudos Ranking: the best total Kudos scores. It was not active until 5 January 2001 due to score bugs within the first PAL editions.
Ghost Attack: Pre-set ghost cars from various courses to compete against.
 Driving tips and links to the MSR message board within Dreamarena.

The site also hosted nine 'New Time Trials' billed as "races created by Sega on an exclusive circuit that you can download and challenge", but these circuits were simply the 'Challenge' tracks (Shibuya Challenge, Westminster Challenge, Pacific Challenge etc.) already present in the game. Reports suggest the top 10 ranking for this feature was never implemented.

The microsite and rankings closed in March 2002 with the demise of Dreamarena and SegaNet.

Development
In 1997, Bizarre Creations were approached by Sega Europe to make a street racer for the upcoming Dreamcast console.  This was after Sega's Kats Sato had discovered they were behind the Formula 1 and Formula 1 97 games on Sony's PlayStation. According to Martyn Chudley, Bizarre Creations' managing director, "Kats was given the task of finding out who was developing Formula 1 for Sony. So, at the ECTS [1997], he pulled out the power cable so he could see the [F1] start-up credits." After a meeting with Sega Europe's then-CEO, Kazutoshi Miyake, Bizarre Creations accepted their offer of work. Martyn Chudley stated that Sega gave Bizarre Creations an opportunity to branch out after learning they had been lined up for further F1 titles.

To model the San Francisco, London and Tokyo settings Bizarre Creations sent staff to each city to take "tens of thousands of photographs" and "hours of video footage in every last location" alongside sourcing detailed maps and aerial photographs. To model the individual buildings one general reference photo of each was taken, alongside multiple close ups to model textures as well as further photos of additional features such as doors and signage, leading to up to 20 reference photos per building. 3D artist Mark Sharratt, the lead on the San Francisco map, told Official Dreamcast Magazine that he "start by scanning in the District Council Land Use contour maps and bringing them into Softimage, then drawing round them to get the scale right", before using the reference photos and video "to get everything the right shape". Sharratt said he then "scan[ned] in all the photographs, remove the perspective in PhotoShop to make them straight", before "remov[ing] the people, trees, wires and stuff from the pictures so they can be used as textures for the buildings". This process was repeated for each city of around 1.5 square miles.

The first PAL release had a number of major bugs. Unsold discs were quickly recalled and replaced with a second PAL version that eliminated most of the major bugs, but not all. Sega Europe also offered replacement disks, the final PAL version, free of charge to anyone who had purchased a bugged copy. The US release and the final PAL version were both free of major bugs, although some minor ones remained.
Martyn Chudley stated that although Bizarre Creations had fixed all bugs reported to them by Sega (who were in charge of Quality Assurance) before release, some bugs must have slipped through Sega's comprehensive testing plan due to the sheer size of the game.

Metropolis Street Racer was also the first racer to have radio stations and DJs talking between music tracks. The soundtrack was composed by Richard Jacques. Some songs in the radio stations are sung by TJ Davis, who also sung songs from the Sega Saturn game, Sonic R.

Reception

The game received "generally favourable reviews" according to the review aggregation website Metacritic. Jim Preston of NextGen said of the game, "Full of good ideas, great graphics, and expert driving, this one hits on all cylinders."

Brandon Justice of IGN said that it "has a great sense of progression, difficulty and refinement throughout, and while it may be too difficult for people with little patience, it is one of the most rewarding gameplay experiences in the history of the genre." However, Shane Satterfield of GameSpot called it "a beautiful racer with accurate physics and tight control, but the kudos system makes it far more challenging than it needs to be."

The game was runner-up for Graphical Achievement at the Edge Magazine Awards 2001 held on 18 April that year.

According to Martyn Chudley, the game sold approximately 120,000 units. The majority were sold in the US with 101,757 units; in Europe, 13,297 units were sold on the first two days meaning less than 5000 were sold in that territory post-launch. Chudley described the sales figures as "measly" and cited the Dreamcast's demise, the game's late arrival and the discovery of high-profile bugs after release as the reasons why. He also stated that Bizarre Creations had invested around £1 million of their own money into the game and they asked Sega about putting the game on Sony's PlayStation 2, but Sega declined. Edge commented during a preview for Project Gotham Racing that releasing MSR exclusively for Dreamcast was comparable to "The Beatles exclusively selling The White Album on Mars".

See also
Driving Emotion Type-S
F355 Challenge
Sega GT
Project Gotham Racing

Notes

References

External links

2000 video games
Bizarre Creations games
Dreamcast games
Dreamcast-only games
Japan in non-Japanese culture
Multiplayer and single-player video games
Racing video games
Sega video games
Video games developed in the United Kingdom
Video games scored by Richard Jacques
Video games set in London
Video games set in San Francisco
Video games set in Tokyo